Corrigiola litoralis is a species of flowering plant known by the common name strapwort. It can be found as a native species in Europe and Africa, and has been introduced to Australia and North America. In Europe it is a plant of shingly pool margins where water levels fluctuate. In Africa it is found in a variety of habitats.

References

External links

Caryophyllaceae
Flora of Africa
Flora of Europe
Taxa named by Carl Linnaeus